Puebla de la Calzada is a Spanish municipality in the province of Badajoz, Extremadura. It has a population of 5,685 (2007) and an area of 14.2 km².

References

External links
Official website 
Profile 

Municipalities in the Province of Badajoz